Lids or Hat World, Inc. is an American retailer specializing in athletic headwear. It primarily operates under the Lids brand with stores in the U.S., Puerto Rico, Canada, Australia, France, Germany, and the United Kingdom plus various websites. The majority of the stores operate in shopping malls and factory outlet centers.

History
Lids Corp. was founded in Boston by best friends Douglass Karp (son of real estate developer Stephen R. Karp) and Ben Fischman (son of real estate developer Steven Fischman) in 1993. Hat World, Inc. was founded in 1995 by George Berger, Glenn Campbell and Scott Molander, with its headquarters office in Sioux Falls, SD.  Hat World's first store opened on November 3, 1995 in the Tippecanoe Mall in Lafayette, Indiana. The second store opened at Muncie Mall in Muncie, Indiana. The company's operations and warehouse were located in Indianapolis. The administrative headquarters was later moved from Sioux Falls to Indianapolis. The original Lids Corp. filed for bankruptcy protection in 2001 and certain Lids stores, the tradename/trademark and other assets were acquired by Hat World,Inc., which subsequently changed its store names from "Hat World" to "Lids."

Hat World, Inc. (dba the new "Lids") was acquired in April 2004 by footwear retailer Genesco Inc. In 2019 Genesco sold Hat World/Lids to a joint venture between Ames Watson, LLC and Fanatics, Inc. Also in 2019, rapper Meek Mill acquired an ownership stake.

References

External links 
 Official LIDS website
 Official LIDS Canadian website
 Official LIDS French Canadian website
 Official LIDS Foundation website

Companies based in Indianapolis
Clothing brands of the United States
Clothing companies established in 1995
Retail companies established in 1995
Hat companies
American companies established in 1995
1995 establishments in Massachusetts
Companies that filed for Chapter 11 bankruptcy in 2001